Dwarven Forge LLC is a company that creates three-dimensional polymer tiles for use with tabletop role-playing games.

History

When Dungeons & Dragons and other tabletop fantasy role-playing games became popular in the late 1970s, players found that it was necessary to track their progress through imaginary dungeons by creating paper maps. Some companies such as Task Force Games responded as early as 1980 by creating modular cardboard tiles that could be used by the gamemaster to quickly lay out an entire dungeon floor-plan, but most gaming groups simply drew a map on a piece of graph paper. 

In the mid-1990s, Stefan Pokorny, an artist who played Dungeons & Dragons, started to paint the 25 mm miniatures that he used to represent his characters. He was disappointed that his carefully painted miniatures were displayed on maps pencilled onto on graph paper, so he designed and created some hand-painted resin-based three-dimensional tiles. The other players liked the tiles, and since Pokorny was struggling to make ends meet as an artist, he founded Dwarven Forge in 1996 as a side business. Pokorny designed modular tiles that could be used to create a three-dimensional dungeon floor plan, cast and painted the masters, sent them away to be cast in a durable polymer, and then marketed the finished tiles through retail games stores and at conventions. He sold out of his stock in four hours at his first appearance at Gen Con.

Tiles

Pokorny and his creative team start by drawing a sketch of a potential tile. Using the sketch, they create a putty prototype of the tile that is then used to form a rubber mold, which in turn is used to cast a tile master. Dwarven Forge then sends the master to a factory in China, which then manufactures required copies of the tile. Tiles were originally cast in resin, but that proved to be too brittle, so Dwarven Forge eventually switched to a more durable PVC polymer marketed as "Dwarvenite". The pieces use the 1"=5' scale found in D&D, Pathfinder, and other popular role-playing games. Basic pieces include floors, walls, furniture and swinging doors. Many specialty pieces have been created as well, including everything from temple altars to giant mushrooms. Some pieces incorporate LEDs for special effects such as torches. In 2019 with their Dungeon of Doom Kickstarter, Dwarven Forge began incorporating small anchor magnets attached to the bottom of each piece so that they will stay together once placed on a metal tray or against a metal wall.

Awards
At the ENnie Awards in 2019, Dwarven Forge's Dungeon of Doom Modular Terrain won the 2019 Silver ENnie for "Best Aid/Accessory – Non-Digital".

Reception
The live-play D&D show, Critical Role has featured Dwarven Forge since some of its earliest use of 3D tabletop terrain for battle maps. Episode 44 of campaign 1, 'The Sunken Tomb', which aired March 10 2016, featured a substantial build (revealed at 2 hours, 47 minutes into the episode)  and Dwarven Forge has appeared regularly on their table ever since. 

In the November 2009 issue of Wired, Michael Harrison liked the "massive variety of sets and different looks. From caverns to castles to inns, each set has its own accessories to help round out the rooms. Tables and chairs, columns and pits, even plates and tankards and food. It adds a level of detail to your encounters that even the most talented artist would have trouble replicating on a dry-erase board." Harrison also complimented the pieces' durability, saying, "the Dwarven Forge pieces are sturdy and built to last." However, he did admit that the sets were costly and took up a lot of room. "Because of their quality, the terrain is not cheap. Each set runs between $70-$120, and if you're aiming to create entire dungeons, you may need several sets. You'll also want to make sure that you've got plenty of space. A dedicated gaming room is necessary, as you'll need plenty of shelf space to store the Dwarven Forge boxes and a large table to build on." He also noted that Dwarven Forge pieces worked better when set up in advance rather than being constructed as needed. He concluded "Wired: Modular, ultra-detailed, well-made, and a whole lot of fun, Tired: Takes up a lot of space, pricey, hard for on-the-fly dungeon creation. Either way, this one definitely gets the GeekDad stamp of approval."

On his website Sly Flourish, Mike Shea noted the high cost of collecting Dwarven Forge. "A solid set of Dwarven Forge dungeon pieces runs about $300 to $500 on the low end." His recommendation was to "Get big pieces that matter" and "Focus on a few versatile pieces and get a lot of them."

Reviews
In 1998, the online second edition of Pyramid reviewed the Mastermaze series produced by Dwarven Forge.

References

External links

ENnies winners
Fantasy role-playing game supplements
Role-playing game mapping aids